Miss International Indonesia (in Indonesia; Puteri Indonesia Lingkungan) is one of the beauty pageant title by Puteri Indonesia Org., the winners of Puteri Indonesia Lingkungan will represent Indonesia in one of the oldest Big Four international beauty pageants, Miss International. Indonesia start its debut in pageantry on 1960. The first pageant appointing Indonesia's delegates to this contest was Miss Java held on 1960, 1968, and 1969. In the early 1970s the founder of Beauty Salon "Andy's Beauty", Mrs. Andi Nurhayati together with 7th Governor of Jakarta Special Capital Region, Mr. Ali Sadikin took off the franchise and organize "Puteri Indonesia" and appoint its Puteri Indonesia Lingkungan winner to Miss International. 

Due to its absence regarding the governmental regulation towards pageantry from 1978 to 2006, Andi's Beauty loses its franchise to Miss International Pageant and is moving to Puteri Indonesia, a national pageant held by Mustika Ratu; Indonesia's oldest and biggest cosmetics herbal company. Since 2007, the winner of Puteri Indonesia Lingkungan will automatically represent Indonesia on Miss International Beauty Pageants. The president-owner of Puteri Indonesia are The Highest Royal Family of Surakarta Sunanate, Mooryati Soedibyo and Putri Kuswisnuwardhani.

Gallery of winners

Titleholders
This is a list of women who represented of Indonesia at the Miss International beauty pageant.
Color key

Crossovers to other international pageants

Indonesia's Placement at Miss International

Notes
Irma Priscilla Hardisurya is now working as a journalist, artist, and fashion consultant.
Lydia Arlini Wahab is a mother of Indonesian female singer named Prisa Rianzi.
Indri Hapsari Soeharto was Putri Remaja 1976 contestant (Miss Teen Indonesia 1976) and awarded as Miss Personality. Later, she made appearance in a movie titled Bulu-Bulu Cendrawasih on 1978, directed by Umar Kayam
Rahma Landy Sjahruddin work as an actress, later continue her career as a dentist.
Duma Riris Silalahi is married to Indonesian Idol 2005's runner up, Judika Sihotang.
Zukhriatul Hafizah Muhammad now well known as an anti-cigarette activist and currently working as a staff in Ministry of Tourism. Recently she and her team opened a beauty camp called "Ratu Sejagad" who also handling the preparation of Indonesia's first ever Miss International, Kevin Liliana.
Reisa Kartikasari Brotoasmoro later married a Prince of Surakarta and named as Princess of Surakarta. She's also host the Dr. Oz Indonesia.
Liza Elly Purnamasari was crowned Miss Earth Indonesia 2010, but she was unable to compete in Miss Earth 2010 and was replaced by Jessica Tji, her first runner up in the following year.
Kevin Lilliana Junaedy is currently working as journalist and news anchor in SCTV
Jolene Marie Cholock-Rotinsulu is an actress, singer and volunteered for 2018 Asian Para Games and Tokyo, 2020 Olympic Games.
Putu Ayu Saraswati is an doctor and Indonesian People's Consultative Assembly Ambassador.

See also
Puteri Indonesia
Puteri Indonesia Lingkungan
Miss International

References

Beauty pageants in Indonesia
Miss International

Puteri Indonesia
Indonesian awards
Miss Indonesia International
Lists of women in beauty pageants